Jannick Buyla Sam (born 6 October 1998) is a professional footballer who plays for Primera Federación club CD Badajoz. Born in Spain, he represents the Equatorial Guinea national team. Mainly a right winger, he can also play as an attacking midfielder.

Nicknamed Nick in Spain, Buyla is a former member of the Equatorial Guinea national under-20 team.

Club career
Born in Zaragoza, Aragón to Equatorial Guinean parents, Buyla represented UD Amistad, CD Oliver and Real Zaragoza as a youth. On 2 August 2017, after finishing his formation, he was loaned to Segunda División B side CD Tudelano for one year.

Buyla made his senior debut on 24 September 2017, in a 0–0 home draw against CD Lealtad. He returned to Zaragoza on 24 January 2018, being assigned to the B-team, and finished the campaign by suffering relegation.

On 11 May 2019, Buyla made his first team debut by coming on as a late substitute for James Igbekeme in a 3–0 Segunda División away success over Extremadura UD. Roughly one year later, he renewed his contract until 2024 and was definitely promoted to the first team for the 2020–21 season.

On 28 January 2021, after featuring rarely, Buyla was loaned to third division side UCAM Murcia CF for the remainder of the campaign. On 5 July, he moved to Primera División RFEF side Gimnàstic de Tarragona also in a temporary deal.

References

External links

1998 births
Living people
Citizens of Equatorial Guinea through descent
Equatoguinean footballers
Association football wingers
Association football midfielders
Equatorial Guinea youth international footballers
Equatorial Guinea international footballers
2021 Africa Cup of Nations players
Footballers from Zaragoza
Spanish footballers
CD Tudelano footballers
Real Zaragoza B players
Real Zaragoza players
UCAM Murcia CF players
Gimnàstic de Tarragona footballers
CD Badajoz players
Segunda División B players
Tercera División players
Segunda División players
Spanish sportspeople of Equatoguinean descent